Sorsk (Khakas: , Sorığ) is a town in the Republic of Khakassia, Russia, located  northwest of Abakan. Population:

History
It was founded as the work settlement of Dzerzhinsky in the 1940s. It was renamed Sorsk and granted town status in 1966.

Administrative and municipal status
Within the framework of administrative divisions, it is, together with three rural localities, incorporated as the Town of Sorsk—an administrative unit with the status equal to that of the districts. As a municipal division, the Town of Sorsk is incorporated as Sorsk Urban Okrug.

References

Notes

Sources

Cities and towns in Khakassia
Cities and towns built in the Soviet Union
Populated places established in the 1940s